Drepanophorus may refer to:
 Drepanophorus (worm), a genus of worms in the family Drepanophoridae
 Drepanophorus, a genus of worms in the family Aporcelaimidae, synonym of Paraxonchium
 Drepanophorus, a genus of birds in the family Paradisaeidae, synonym of Drepanornis